Lipiny may refer to:

Lipiny, Augustów County in Podlaskie Voivodeship (north-east Poland)
Lipiny, Hajnówka County in Podlaskie Voivodeship (north-east Poland)
Lipiny, Siemiatycze County in Podlaskie Voivodeship (north-east Poland)
Lipiny, Kutno County in Łódź Voivodeship (central Poland)
Lipiny, Łódź East County in Łódź Voivodeship (central Poland)
Lipiny, Gmina Warta in Łódź Voivodeship (central Poland)
Lipiny, Gmina Złoczew in Łódź Voivodeship (central Poland)
Lipiny, Łuków County in Lublin Voivodeship (east Poland)
Lipiny, Opole Lubelskie County in Lublin Voivodeship (east Poland)
Lipiny, Lesser Poland Voivodeship (south Poland)
Lipiny, Dąbrowa County in Lesser Poland Voivodeship (south Poland)
Lipiny, Subcarpathian Voivodeship (south-east Poland)
Lipiny, Świętokrzyskie Voivodeship (south-central Poland)
Lipiny, Włoszczowa County in Świętokrzyskie Voivodeship (south-central Poland)
Lipiny, Ciechanów County in Masovian Voivodeship (east-central Poland)
Lipiny, Mińsk County in Masovian Voivodeship (east-central Poland)
Lipiny, Otwock County in Masovian Voivodeship (east-central Poland)
Lipiny, Przysucha County in Masovian Voivodeship (east-central Poland)
Lipiny, Radom County in Masovian Voivodeship (east-central Poland)
Lipiny, Gmina Przesmyki in Masovian Voivodeship (east-central Poland)
Lipiny, Gmina Zbuczyn in Masovian Voivodeship (east-central Poland)
Lipiny, Wyszków County in Masovian Voivodeship (east-central Poland)
Lipiny, Zwoleń County in Masovian Voivodeship (east-central Poland)
Lipiny, Chodzież County in Greater Poland Voivodeship (west-central Poland)
Lipiny, Gmina Osiek Mały in Greater Poland Voivodeship (west-central Poland)
Lipiny, Gmina Przedecz in Greater Poland Voivodeship (west-central Poland)
Lipiny, Ostrów Wielkopolski County in Greater Poland Voivodeship (west-central Poland)
Lipiny, Lubusz Voivodeship (west Poland)
Lipiny (Świętochłowice), a district of the town of Świętochłowice in the Silesian Voivodeship (south Poland)

See also
 Lipan (disambiguation)
 Lipany (disambiguation)
 Lipiany (disambiguation)